This article displays the rosters for the participating teams at the 1989 Tournament of the Americas played in Mexico City, Mexico from June 8 to June 18, 1989.

Group A

Cuba

4 Ángel Caballero
5 Augusto Duquesne
6 Lazaro Borrell
7 Noángel Luaces
8 Eduardo Cabrera
9 Raúl Dubois
10 Leonardo Pérez
11 Adalberto Rodríguez
12 Luciano Rivero
13 Daniel Scott
14 Roberto Simón
15 Andrés Guibert
Head coach:  Carmelo Ortega

Dominican Republic

4 Felipe Payano
5 Víctor Hansen
6 Evaristo Pérez Carrión
7 José Mercedes
8 José Vargas
9 José Domínguez
10 Máximo Tapia
11 Vinicio Muñoz
12 Hugo Cabrera
13 José Molina
14 Héctor Gil
15 Pedro Leandro Rodríguez
Head coach:  Leandro de la Cruz

Mexico

4 Antonio Reyes
5 Juan Espinoza
6 Julio Gallardo
7 Roberto González
8 Enrique González
9 Rafael Willis
10 Luis López
11 Enrique Ortega
12 Arturo Sánchez
13 José Luis Arroyos
14 Rafael Holguín
15 Norberto Mena
Head coach:  Gustavo Saggiante

Panama

4 Tito Malcolm
5 Enrique Grenald
6 Gilberto Watson
7 Reinaldo Cousin
8 Anthony Fiss
9 Javier Clifford
10 Mario Gálvez
11 Iván Jaén
12 Edgar Macías
13 Fernando Pinillo
14 Leroy Jackson
15 Amado Martínez
Head coach:  Reginaldo Grenald

Puerto Rico

4 Rafael Hernández
5 Federico López
6 Raymond Gause
7 Félix Rivera
8 Jerome Mincy
9 James Carter
10 Pablo Alicea
11 Edwin Pellot
12 Mario Morales
13 Orlando Marrero
14 Francisco de León
15 Ramón Ramos
Head coach:  Raymond Dalmau

United States

4 Elliot Perry
5 Rodney Monroe
6 Jason Matthews
7 Gary Payton
8 Chris Corchiani
9 Greg Dennis
10 Lionel Simmons
11 Antonio Davis
12 Matt Bullard
13 Billy Owens
14 Christian Laettner
15 Doug Smith
Head coach:  Bobby Cremins

Group B

Argentina

4 Andrés Santamaría
5 Marcelo Richotti
6 Diego Maggi
7 Carlos Cerutti
8 Julio Rodríguez
9 Marcelo Milanesio
10 Luis González
11 Miguel Cortijo
12 Sebastián Uranga
13 Carlos Romano
14 Diego Osella
15 Rubén Scolari
Head coach:  Alberto Finguer

Brazil

4 Paulão Berger
5 Maury
6 Gerson
7 Pipoka
8 Evandro
9 Cadum
10 Guerrinha
11 Marcel
12 Luiz Felipe
13 Paulão Silva
14 Oscar
15 Israel
Head coach:  Hélio Rubens Garcia

Canada

4 Rob Samuels
5 David Turcotte
6 Eli Pasquale
7 Spencer McKay
8 Alan Kristmanson
9 Tony Simms
10 Stewart Granger
11 Leo Rautins
12 Phil Ohl
13 Cord Clemens
14 John Karpis
15 Gerald Kazanowski
Head coach:  Ken Shields

Ecuador

4 Eduardo Chong-Qui
5 Tomás Caicedo
6 José Saltos
7 Demetrio Vernaza
8 Roland Ponce
9 Armando Rubio
10 Enguels Tenorio
11 Carlos Carrera
12 Ayub Sánchez
13 Jeff Escalante
14 Hugo Angulo
15 José Obando
Head coach:  Gonzalo Troya

Paraguay

4 Hugo González
5 Víctor Ljubetic
6 Ángel Vega
7 Gerardo Koppman
8 Luis Ocampos
9 Luis Dose
10 Santiago Ochipinti
11 Estéban Cabrera
12 Luis Schmeda
13 Jorge Cristaldo
14 Santiago Maciel
15 Arnoldo Penskofer
Head coach:  Carlos María Ljubetic

Venezuela

4 David Díaz
5 César Portillo
6 Felice Parisi
7 Armando Becker
8 Rostyn González
9 José Echenique
10 Sam Shepherd
11 Carl Herrera
12 Luis Sosa
13 Gabriel Estaba
14 Iván Olivares
15 Armando Palacios
Head coach:  Jesús Cordovez

Bibliography

External links
1989 FIBA Americas Championship for Men at fiba.com

FIBA AmeriCup squads